Vineyard Haven, foaled 2006, is grey roan American Thoroughbred racehorse, sired by Lido Palace out of Princess Aloha. He is trained by Saeed bin Suroor and is owned by Godolphin Racing.

Vineyard Haven is a multiple Grade 1 stakes winner, and qualified for the Breeders' Cup Juvenile with his victory in the Champagne Stakes on October 4, 2008.

References
 Vineyard Haven's pedigree
 Vineyard Haven on NTRA
 Vineyard Haven on Breeder's Cup.com

2006 racehorse births
Thoroughbred family 9-h
Racehorses bred in Kentucky
Racehorses trained in the United States
Racehorses trained in the United Arab Emirates

standing in Uruguay since 2016